In quantum mechanics, the Gorini–Kossakowski–Sudarshan–Lindblad equation (GKSL equation, named after Vittorio Gorini, Andrzej Kossakowski, George Sudarshan and Göran Lindblad), master equation in Lindblad form, quantum Liouvillian, or Lindbladian is one of the general forms of Markovian master equations describing open quantum systems. It generalizes the Schrödinger equation to open quantum systems; that is, systems in contacts with their surroundings. The resulting dynamics is no longer unitary, but still satisfies the property of being trace-preserving and completely positive for any initial condition. 

The Schrödinger equation or, actually, the von Neumann equation, is a special case of the GKSL equation, which has led to some speculation that quantum mechanics may be productively extended and expanded through further application and analysis of the Lindblad equation.  The Schrödinger equation deals with state vectors, which can only describe pure quantum states and are thus less general than density matrices, which can describe mixed states as well.

Motivation 

In the canonical formulation of quantum mechanics, a system's time evolution is governed by unitary dynamics. This implies that there is no decay and phase coherence is maintained throughout the process, and is a consequence of the fact that all participating degrees of freedom are considered. However, any real physical system is not absolutely isolated, and will interact with its environment. This interaction with degrees of freedom external to the system results in dissipation of energy into the surroundings, causing decay and randomization of phase. More so, understanding the interaction of a quantum system with its environment is necessary for understanding many commonly observed phenomena like the spontaneous emission of light from excited atoms, or the performance of many quantum technological devices, like the laser.

Certain mathematical techniques have been introduced to treat the interaction of a quantum system with its environment. One of these is the use of the density matrix, and its associated master equation. While in principle this approach to solving quantum dynamics is equivalent to the Schrödinger picture or Heisenberg picture, it allows more easily for the inclusion of incoherent processes, which represent environmental interactions. The density operator has the property that it can represent a classical mixture of quantum states, and is thus vital to accurately describe the dynamics of so-called open quantum systems.

Definition

The Lindblad master equation for system's density matrix  can be written as (for a pedagogical introduction you may refer to)

The shape of the jump operators describes how the environment acts on the system, and must ultimately be determined from microscopic models of the system-environment dynamics. Finally,  are a set of non-negative coefficients called damping rates. If all  one recovers the von Neumann equation  describing unitary dynamics, which is the quantum analog of the classical Liouville equation.

More generally, the GKSL equation has the form 

The latter is a strict requirement to ensure the dynamics is trace-preserving and completely positive. The number of  operators is arbitrary, and they do not have to satisfy any special properties. But if the system is -dimensional, it can be shown that the master equation can be fully described by a set of  operators, provided they form a basis for the space of operators.  

Since the matrix  is positive semidefinite, it can be diagonalized with a unitary transformation :

where the eigenvalues  are non-negative. If we define another orthonormal operator basis

This reduces the master equation to the same form as before:

Quantum dynamical semigroup

The maps generated by a Lindbladian for various times are collectively referred to as a quantum dynamical semigroup—a family of quantum dynamical maps  on the space of density matrices indexed by a single time parameter  that obey the semigroup property

The Lindblad equation can be obtained by

The semigroup can be recovered as

Invariance properties

The Lindblad equation is invariant under any unitary transformation  of Lindblad operators and constants,

and also under the inhomogeneous transformation

Heisenberg picture

The Lindblad-type evolution of the density matrix in the Schrödinger picture can be equivalently described in the Heisenberg picture
using the following (diagonalized) equation of motion  for each quantum observable :

A similar equation describes the time evolution of the expectation values of observables, given by the Ehrenfest theorem.
Corresponding to the trace-preserving property of the Schrödinger picture Lindblad equation, the Heisenberg picture equation is unital, i.e. it preserves the identity operator.

Physical derivation

The Lindblad master equation describes the evolution of various types of open quantum systems, e.g. a system weakly coupled to a Markovian reservoir.
Note that the  appearing in the equation is not necessarily equal to the bare system Hamiltonian, but may also incorporate effective unitary dynamics arising from the system-environment interaction.

A heuristic derivation, e.g., in the notes by Preskill, begins with a more general form of an open quantum system and converts it into Lindblad form by making the Markovian assumption and expanding in small time. A more physically motivated standard treatment covers three common types of derivations of the Lindbladian starting from a Hamiltonian acting on both the system and environment: the weak coupling limit (described in detail below), the low density approximation, and the singular coupling limit. Each of these relies on specific physical assumptions regarding, e.g., correlation functions of the environment. For example, in the weak coupling limit derivation, one typically assumes that (a) correlations of the system with the environment develop slowly, (b) excitations of the environment caused by system decay quickly, and (c) terms which are fast-oscillating when compared
to the system timescale of interest can be neglected. These three approximations are called Born,
Markov, and rotating wave, respectively.

The weak-coupling limit derivation assumes a quantum system with a finite number of degrees of freedom coupled to a bath containing an infinite number of degrees of freedom. The system and bath each possess a Hamiltonian written in terms of operators acting only on the respective subspace of the total Hilbert space. These Hamiltonians govern the internal dynamics of the uncoupled system and bath. There is a third Hamiltonian that contains products of system and bath operators, thus coupling the system and bath. The most general form of this Hamiltonian is

The dynamics of the entire system can be described by the Liouville equation of motion, . This equation, containing an infinite number of degrees of freedom, is impossible to solve analytically except in very particular cases. What's more, under certain approximations, the bath degrees of freedom need not be considered, and an effective master equation can be derived in terms of the system density matrix, . Also note that is the total unitary operator of the entire system. It is straightforward to confirm that the Liouville equation becomes

where the Hamiltonian  is explicitly time dependent. Also, according to the interaction picture, where . This equation can be integrated directly to give

This implicit equation for  can be substituted back into the Liouville equation to obtain an exact differo-integral equation

Tracing over the bath degrees of freedom, of the aforementioned differo-integral equation yields

This equation is exact for the time dynamics of the system density matrix but requires full knowledge of the dynamics of the bath degrees of freedom. A simplifying assumption called the Born approximation rests on the largeness of the bath and the relative weakness of the coupling, which is to say the coupling of the system to the bath should not significantly alter the bath eigenstates. The master equation becomes

The equation is now explicit in the system degrees of freedom, but is very difficult to solve. A final assumption is the Born-Markov approximation that the time derivative of the density matrix depends only on its current state, and not on its past. This assumption is valid under fast bath dynamics, wherein correlations within the bath are lost extremely quickly, and amounts to replacing  on the right hand side of the equation.

If the interaction Hamiltonian is assumed to have the form

for system operators  and bath operators  then . The master equation becomes

which can be expanded as

The expectation values  are with respect to the bath degrees of freedom.
By assuming rapid decay of these correlations (ideally ), above form of the Lindblad superoperator L is achieved.

Examples

For one jump operator  and no unitary evolution, the Lindblad superoperator, acting on the density matrix , is

Such a term is found regularly in the Lindblad equation as used in quantum optics, where it can express absorption or emission of photons from a reservoir. If one wants to have both absorption and emission, one would need a jump operator for each. This leads to the most common Lindblad equation describing the damping of a quantum harmonic oscillator (representing e.g. a Fabry–Perot cavity) coupled to a thermal bath, with jump operators

If we also add additional unitary evolution generated by the quantum harmonic oscillator Hamiltonian with frequency , we obtain

Additional Lindblad operators can be included to model various forms of dephasing and vibrational relaxation. These methods have been incorporated into grid-based density matrix propagation methods.

See also
 Quantum master equation
 Redfield equation
 Open quantum system
 Quantum jump method

References

 
 
 
 
 
 
 
 
 
 
 
 

 
Pearle, P. (2012). "Simple derivation of the Lindblad equation". European Journal of Physics, 33(4), 805.

External links
 Quantum Optics Toolbox for Matlab
 mcsolve Quantum jump (monte carlo) solver from QuTiP.
 QuantumOptics.jl the quantum optics toolbox in Julia.
 The Lindblad master equation

Quantum mechanics
Equations